Quō vādis? is a Latin phrase meaning "Where are you marching?". It is also commonly translated as "Where are you going?" or, poetically, "Whither goest thou?"

The phrase originates from the Christian tradition regarding Saint Peter's first words to the risen Christ during their encounter along the Appian Way. According to the apocryphal Acts of Peter (Vercelli Acts XXXV; late 2nd century AD), as Peter flees from crucifixion in Rome at the hands of the government, and along the road outside the city, he meets the risen Jesus. In the Latin translation, Peter asks Jesus, "Quō vādis?" He replies, "Rōmam eō iterum crucifīgī" ("I am going to Rome to be crucified again"). Peter then gains the courage to continue his ministry and returns to the city, where he is martyred by being crucified upside-down. The Church of Domine Quo Vadis in Rome is built where the meeting between Peter and Jesus traditionally took place.
The words "quo vadis" as a question also occur at least seven times in the Latin Vulgate.

In culture 

The Polish writer Henryk Sienkiewicz wrote the novel Quo Vadis: A Narrative of the Time of Nero (published in installments between 1895 and 96). The book in turn has been made into motion pictures several times, including a 1951 version that was nominated for eight Academy Awards.  For this and other novels, Sienkiewicz received the 1905 Nobel Prize for Literature.

In a season four episode of M*A*S*H entitled "Quo Vadis, Captain Chandler?" the reference pertains to Jesus Christ. A shellshocked officer arrives at the hospital believing he is the Christ. He has numerous conversations with the characters, including Father Mulcahy. He ultimately leaves the MASH unit for an evacuation hospital, still unrecovered.

Quo Vadis, Aida is a film about the Srebrenica massacre by director Jasmila Žbanić.

Quo Vadis has also been used as a name by many companies and groups. There is a Quo Vadis in London, restaurant established in 1926 in a house where Karl Marx once lived. A students’ club at University of Pittsburgh, established in 1944 to give tours of the Nationality Rooms, is called Quo Vadis.

References

External links
 
 

Latin words and phrases
Saint Peter
Vulgate Latin words and phrases